Grbavica is a 2006 film by Jasmila Žbanić about the life of a single mother in contemporary Sarajevo in the aftermath of systematic rapes of Bosniak women by Serbian soldiers during the Bosnian War. It was released in the United Kingdom as Esma's Secret: Grbavica, and in US as Grbavica: Land of My Dreams.

The film shows, through the eyes of the main character Esma, her teenage daughter Sara, and others, how everyday life is still being shaped by the Bosnian War of the 1990s. The film was an international co-production between companies from Bosnia, Austria, Croatia, and Germany; it received funding from the German television companies ZDF and Arte. Grbavica received an enthusiastic response from critics, earning a 98% rating on Rotten Tomatoes.

It won the Golden Bear at the 56th Berlin International Film Festival and it was Bosnia and Herzegovina's official entry for the Best Foreign Language Film at the 79th Academy Awards but it was not nominated.

Background
The title refers to the neighbourhood of Sarajevo where Esma lives, which was one of the most traumatized neighbourhoods in the city.

According to the director,

...in 1992 everything changed and I realized that I was living in a war in which sex was used as part of a war strategy to humiliate women and thereby cause the destruction of an ethnic group. 20,000 women were systematically raped in Bosnia during the war.

In the film, the Serbian rapists are referred to as Chetniks, a term which some of the population of Sarajevo (mostly Bosnian Muslims and Croats and Sarajevan Serbs) used for the besieging Serb troops.

Plot
Single mother Esma lives with her 12-year-old daughter Sara in post-war Sarajevo. Sara wants to go on a school field trip and her mother starts working as a waitress at a nightclub to earn the money for the trip.

Sara befriends Samir, who, like Sara, has no father. Both of their fathers allegedly died as war heroes. Samir is surprised to find out that Sara does not know the circumstances of her father's death. Samir's own father was killed by Serbian military near Žuč when he refused to leave the trench he was defending. Whenever Sara and her mother discuss this delicate topic, however, Esma's responses are always vague. 
The situation grows more complicated when students who can provide a certificate proving that they are the offspring of war heroes can go on the field trip for free. Esma explains to Sara that her father's corpse was never found and that she has no certificate. She promises to try to obtain the document. Secretly, however, Esma attempts to borrow the money Sara needs from her friend Sabina, her aunt and her boss.

Sara is haunted by a nagging feeling that something is not right. Shocked and bewildered when she discovers she is not mentioned as the child of a war hero on the list of pupils going on the school trip, Sara lashes out at Samir. At home, however, she confronts her mother and demands to know the truth. Esma breaks down and finally admits that she was raped at a prisoner camp and forced to have the child who resulted from this violation. Sara realizes she is the child of a Serbian soldier. This discovery brings her closer to her mother and helps overcome her trauma. In the end, Sara leaves for the field trip, not waving to her mother until the last moment. On the bus, the students start to sing a popular 70's song "Sarajevo, ljubavi moja" (eng. Sarajevo,  My Love), written and performed by Kemal Monteno, and Sara joins in.

Cast
 Mirjana Karanović as Esma Halilović
 Luna Mijović as Sara 
 Leon Lučev as Pelda 
 Kenan Ćatić as Samir 
 Jasna Beri as Sabina  
 Dejan Aćimović as Čenga 
 Bogdan Diklić as Šaran 
 Emir Hadžihafizbegović as Puška 
 Ermin Bravo as Professor Muha 
 Semka Sokolović-Bertok as Pelda's Mother 
 Maike Höhne as Jabolka 
 Jasna Žalica as Plema 
 Nada Džurevska as Aunt Safija 
 Emina Muftić as Vasvija 
 Dunja Pašić as Mila

Awards
Wins
Golden Bear - Best Film - 56th Berlin International Film Festival 2006
Peace Film Award - Berlin Film Festival 2006 
Prize of the Ecumenical Jury - Berlin Film Festival 2006
Kosomorama Award - Best Film
Reykjavik International Film Festival - Best Film
AFI Film Festival - Narrative Grand Jury Prize
Brussels European Film Festival - Prize TV Canvas for Best Film and Award Best Actress (to Mirjana Karanović)
Ourence Film Festival - Award Best Actress (to Mirjana Karanović)
Portland International Film Festival - Audience Award
Thessaloniki Film Festival - Woman & Equality Award
Bosnian-Herzegovinian Film Festival in New York - Audience Award
Sarajevo Film Festival - Ivica Matić Award for director 

Nominations
Sundance Film Festival - Grand Jury Prize
European Film Award - Best Film and Best Actress

See also
 List of submissions to the 79th Academy Awards for Best Foreign Language Film

References

External links 
 

Grbavica at Dogwoof pictures

2006 films
Bosnia and Herzegovina war drama films
Austrian war drama films
Croatian war drama films
German war drama films
Bosnian War films
Golden Bear winners
Bosnian-language films
Films directed by Jasmila Žbanić
Anti-war films
Films set in Sarajevo
Yugoslav Wars in fiction
2000s political films
2000s war films
Films about rape
Films about Bosnian genocide
2000s German films